Riverside is an unincorporated community in Ravalli County, Montana, United States. Its elevation is 3,517 feet (1,072 m), and it is located at  (46.2746439, -114.1581505).

A post office operated in Riverside for a short time: it was established on January 16, 1889 and closed on May 28, 1895. The community once possessed a railroad station, which is no longer in existence; at various times, it was known as Riverside, Haggin, or River Siding. Today, an RV park is located in the area.

References

Unincorporated communities in Ravalli County, Montana
Unincorporated communities in Montana